The Godavari River has its catchment area in seven states of India: Maharashtra, Telangana, Chhattisgarh, Madhya Pradesh,  Andhra Pradesh, Karnataka and Odisha. The number of dams constructed in Godavari basin is the highest among all the river basins in India. Nearly 350 major and medium dams and barrages had been constructed in the river basin by the year 2012.
 Jalaput
 Chintalapudi lift
 Uttarrandhra Sujala Sravanthi lift
 Balimela Reservoir
 Upper Kolab
 Dummugudem Lift Irrigation Schemes
 Nizam Sagar
 Sriram Sagar or Pochampadu
 Kakatiya Canal
 SRSP Flood Flow Canal
 Manjara Dam
 Manjira Reservoir
 Singur Dam
 Shanigaram Reservoir
 Lower Manair Dam
 Mid Manair Dam
 Upper Manair Dam
 Yellampally
 Taliperu Project
 Babli barrage or Babhali
 Devadula lift irrigation project
 Polavaram Project
 Inchampalli Project
 Sadarmat

 Alisagar lift irrigation scheme
 Kaddam
 Sri Komaram Bheem Project
 Lower Tirna
 Siddeshwar or Purna
 Yeldari Dam
 Godavari Canal
 Mula Dam
 Bhandardara Dam
 Isapur Dam or Upper Penganga
 Upper Dudhana Dam
 Jayakwadi or Paithan
 Upper Pravara
 Upper Indravati dam
 Upper Wain Ganga (Bheemgarh Dam)
 Upper Wardha Dam
 Lower Wardha Dam
 Majalgaon Dam
 Ghatghar Dam
 Upper Vaitarana Dam
 Vishnupuri Barrage
 Sirpur Dam or Bagh reservoir
 Gosi kd Dam or Gosi Kund dam
 Totladoh Dam
 Yeldari Dam
 Kamthikhairy Dam or Pench dam
 Erai Dam
 Tultuli Dam
 Arunawati Dam
 Lower Wunna Dam or Wadgaon
 Manar Dam
 Lower Pus Dam
 Ramtek Dam
 Pench diversion Project, Madhya Pradesh

See also
River Basins in Madhya Pradesh
Godavari Water Disputes Tribunal
List of dams and reservoirs in Maharashtra
List of dams and reservoirs in Andhra Pradesh
List of dams and reservoirs in Telangana
List of dams and reservoirs in India

External links
 For Irrigation Projects in Maharashtra, refer to http://www.mahagovid.org/maha_dams.htm
The Majalgaon dynamic regulation pilot project
 https://web.archive.org/web/20050404205051/http://ceamt.vidcngp.com/pro/index.htm
 https://web.archive.org/web/20050406062502/http://www.godavarimahamandal.com/
 For Irrigation Projects in Madhya Pradesh, refer to: http://www.mp.nic.in/wrd/Comp_Works/SRLD/SRLD_index.asp
Godavari River Delta
 Godavari river water sharing accord
Interstate river water disputes act - 1956 and its legal provisions

References

.
.
Irrigation projects
Irrigation in Andhra Pradesh
Agriculture in Maharashtra
Godavari River